Kaiserdamm is a Berlin U-Bahn station located on line U2. It is linked to the Messe Nord/ICC station of the Berlin S-Bahn.

Opened in 1908, this station was built by A. Grenander. In 1936, it was renamed to Kaiserdamm/Messedamm; in 1967 it got the name Adenauerdamm (Messedamm). However, protests from the people living nearby led to another change to the former name (Adenauer — the chancellor of West Germany was not well liked in Berlin in these days).

See also
Messe Berlin
International Congress Centrum
Zentraler Omnibusbahnhof Berlin

References

External links

U2 (Berlin U-Bahn) stations
Buildings and structures in Charlottenburg-Wilmersdorf
Railway stations in Germany opened in 1908